Serge D. Aubin (born February 15, 1975) is a Canadian ice hockey coach and a former professional ice hockey centre who played 374 games in the National Hockey League for the Colorado Avalanche, Columbus Blue Jackets and Atlanta Thrashers. He is currently serving as head coach of Eisbären Berlin in the German DEL.

Playing career
Aubin was drafted in the 1994 NHL Entry Draft, 7th Round, 161st Overall by the Pittsburgh Penguins.  He spent his junior years playing in the QMJHL, playing for the Drummondville Voltigeurs and the Granby Bisons.  Until 1999, Aubin was mostly playing for the NHL's farm league, having only played one NHL game for the Colorado Avalanche.  He spent time with the Hampton Roads Admirals of the ECHL and in the AHL with the Syracuse Crunch and the Hershey Bears.

After playing 15 more regular season games and 17 playoff games for Colorado, Aubin moved to the Columbus Blue Jackets as a free agent on July 11, 2000. It was with the Blue Jackets where Aubin had his best season in 2000–01, scoring 13 goals and 17 assists for 30 points and only missed one game the entire season.  After another season with Columbus he was brought back to Colorado, but after just one season, Aubin was claimed by the Atlanta Thrashers NHL waiver draft. In the 2003–04 he scored 25 points, 5 short of his NHL career best in point-scoring.

During the 2004–05 NHL lockout, which resulted in the cancellation of the 2004–05 NHL season, Aubin played in Switzerland for Genève-Servette HC. Aubin returned to the Thrashers for the 2005–06 season, his last in the NHL. He returned to Geneva for the 2006–07 season. After the season ended for HC Genève-Servette, he was hired by EHC Biel to play in the Nationalliga B playoff finals and in a possible promotion series. Aubin was named captain of the Canadian team for the 2007 Spengler Cup, he signed than on 7 April 2009 by HC Fribourg-Gottéron.

Following a Quarterfinal defeat in the 2010–11 season, Aubin left Fribourg as a free agent and signed a two-year contract with Deutsche Eishockey Liga club, the Hamburg Freezers, on March 28, 2011. In 46 games, Aubin produced a respectable 31 points. With his veteran experience and leadership a positive for the Freezers, Aubin returned to play in the following pre-season European Tournament, however after suffering a severe thumb injury Aubin was unable to play for the Freezers in the 2012–13 season and announced his retirement on January 15, 2013.

Coaching career
Aubin was then named an assistant coach for the Freezers, beginning the 2013–14 season. In the following season he replaced Benoit Laporte on September 25, 2014, and took over head coaching responsibilities. In November 2014, he was named to the coaching staff of the Canadian Men's National Team for the Deutschland-Cup, serving as assistant to head coach Jeff Tomlinson. One year later, Aubin served as an assistant coach for the German Men's National Team at the Deutschland-Cup. In January 2015, he signed a contract extension, that would keep him in Hamburg until 2017. However, the Freezers organization folded in May 2016, which ended Aubin's coaching tenure in Hamburg.

On June 7, 2016, Aubin was named head coach of the Vienna Capitals of the Austrian Hockey League. He guided the team to the championship in his first year as coach. On December 29, 2017, the ZSC Lions of the National League announced that Aubin would take over the head coaching job at ZSC starting with the 2018–19 season. He was sacked on January 14, 2019 because under his guidance, the team did not develop as the club leaders had hoped for. In May 2019, he signed a two-year deal as head coach of German DEL team Eisbären Berlin.

Career statistics

Awards and honours

References

External links

1975 births
Living people
Atlanta Thrashers players
EHC Biel players
Canadian ice hockey centres
Cleveland Lumberjacks players
Colorado Avalanche players
Columbus Blue Jackets players
Drummondville Voltigeurs players
French Quebecers
Genève-Servette HC players
Granby Bisons players
Hamburg Freezers players
Hampton Roads Admirals players
HC Fribourg-Gottéron players
Hershey Bears players
Ice hockey people from Quebec
People from Val-d'Or
Pittsburgh Penguins draft picks
Quebec Amateur Athletic Association players
Syracuse Crunch players
Canadian expatriate ice hockey players in Germany
Canadian expatriate ice hockey players in Switzerland